Inchara Rao made her debut in Kannada films in 2007 with Mano Murthy-composition, "Nanna Stylu Berene" from Geleya. Her rise to prominence came with the release of the song "Kareyole" from RangiTaranga (2015). The song fetched her a Filmfare Award.

Kannada film songs

2007

2013

2015

2016

2017

2018

Other languages

References

Rao, Inchara
Kannada film songs